Cora canari is a species of basidiolichen in the family Hygrophoraceae. It was formally described as a new species in 2016 by Freddy Nugra, Manuela Dal Forno, and Robert Lücking. The specific epithet canari refers to the Cañari people of pre-Incan Ecuador. The lichen is only known to occur at the type locality in the Morona-Santiago Province of Ecuador, where it grows as an epiphyte on tree trunks and branches.

References

canari
Lichen species
Lichens described in 2016
Lichens of Ecuador
Taxa named by Robert Lücking
Basidiolichens